The Peter A. Allard School of Law is the law school of the University of British Columbia. The faculty offers the Juris Doctor (J.D.) degree. The faculty features courses on business law, tax law, environmental and natural resource law, indigenous law, Pacific Rim issues, and feminist legal theory.

It was renamed from the University of British Columbia Faculty of Law in 2015 to honor a $30M gift from Peter Allard, an alumnus, which followed a 2011 gift from him of about $12M.

History
UBC offered lectures in law from 1920, but the university's faculty of law was established in 1945, and was served by George F. Curtis (1906–2005) as the founding dean, until he retired in 1971. Because it lacked adequate infrastructure, the law school used army huts from World War II, until a permanent structure was built in 1951, which was named after Curtis; it was replaced by Allard Hall in 2009.

In recognition of a donation from UBC law alumnus Peter A. Allard, the law school was renamed the Peter A. Allard School of Law, on 22 January 2015; previously, it had been named University of British Columbia Faculty of Law. Allard is the son of one-time Edmonton Oilers co-owner, Dr. Charles "Chuck" Allard, who also brought the SCTV sketch comedy television series to Edmonton.

Academics
In 2022, both QS World and Times Higher Education ranked Allard the second-best common law school in the Canada, ranking behind only the University of Toronto. Academically, the school is amongst the most selective in the nation, with a median LSAT score of 166, or the 91st percentile, for the entering class of 2022.

Allard Hall
The school is located at the University of British Columbia's campus in Vancouver, British Columbia.  In 2011 it moved out of its former building, a brutalist-style building with malfunctioning heating and cooling and into a new building that had recently been completed. The building cost around $56M; the university used $21M of its own funds and the rest came from donations, including $12M from The Law Foundation of B.C. In 2011 shortly before students and faculty began moving in, Peter Allard, an alumnus, donated about $12 million to the school, with about $10M of it going to complete the capital campaign; the building was named after him.

Allard Prize for International Integrity

The Allard Prize was established in 2012 and was initially funded by part of the 2011 gift from Allard and further funded by a subsequent $30M donation by Allard in 2015. The Allard Prize became independent of the Allard School of Law at the University of British Columbia on 21 June 2019.

The first prize was awarded in 2013, and it is given biennially to an individual, movement or organization that has "demonstrated exceptional courage and leadership in combating corruption, especially through promoting transparency, accountability and the Rule of Law". It is one of the world's largest prizes dedicated to the fight against corruption and protecting human rights.

The winner receives CAD$100,000 and an Allard Prize award which is an original work of art; Honourable Mention recipients receive an Allard Prize award and may be awarded a cash amount at the discretion of the Allard Prize Committee.

Many Allard Prize nominees and recipients have been, and continue to be, subjected to threats, violence, imprisonment and other attacks associated with their anti-corruption and human rights activities. One Honourable Mention recipient (Sergei Magnitsky) was nominated posthumously after being tortured and dying in a Russian prison.

Publications

UBC Law Review 
The University of British Columbia Law Review is the school's official law review and is published by the UBC Law Review Society. Similar to the Harvard Law Review, the editorial process and business of the Society is run by Juris Doctor students, while manuscripts submitted to the journal are peer-reviewed by professors with specialized knowledge of the subject matter. It was first published in 1949 as a collection of legal essays entitled the UBC Legal Notes. In 1959, it officially became the UBC Law Review. It was incorporated as a non-profit society in 1966. The UBC Law Review is a top ranking scholarly publication in Canada and globally, alongside the University of Toronto Law Journal and McGill Law Journal.

Table of Statutory Limitations 
First published in 1955 as a section of the UBC Law Review, the Table of Statutory Limitations has since matured into an annual compendium of legal limitation periods of various statutes. The TSL is published by students at the school.

Annual Review of Insolvency Law 
The only Canadian peer-reviewed journal dedicated to insolvency and bankruptcy law. This annual publication offers articles by scholars and practitioners on personal and commercial insolvency law.

Canadian Journal of Family Law 

First published in 1978, the Canadian Journal of Family Law is Canada's first family law journal. The journal is a biannual interdisciplinary journal that publishes both English and French academic articles on a broad range of issues related to family law. The journal is peer reviewed by an advisory board consisting of legal professionals and academics. It is produced by an editorial staff of students at the school.

Masks: The Online Journal of Law and Theatre 
An interdisciplinary peer-reviewed journal based at the school. The journal focuses on the intersections of Law and theatre.

UBC International Law Journal 
The UBC International Law Journal is an online open access academic journal published by students at the school. The journal was initially created through the UBC International Law Society. The journal publishes exclusively student work, reviewed by students. The first issue was published in November 2008.

Legal Eye newspaper 
The Legal Eye is a newspaper published monthly by students at the school. Started in September 2003, the Legal Eye serves as a forum for reporting on news about the Faculty, broader legal community, case commentary, the occasional recipe, book/restaurant/film reviews, event reviews, and for recognizing student activities and achievements.

Notable faculty
 Beverley McLachlin , 1974–1981, became Chief Justice of Canada in 2000.
Joel Bakan, author of The Corporation.

Notable alumni
Donald Brenner, former chief justice of the Supreme Court of British Columbia
Kim Brooks, dean of both law and management at Dalhousie University
Kim Campbell, first woman prime minister of Canada
Joe Clark , former prime minister of Canada withdrew after first-year at Allard School of Law.
Ujjal Dosanjh , 33rd premier of British Columbia 
Ed Fast, former minister of international trade, Member of Parliament for Abbotsford since 2006
Lance Finch, Chief Justice of British Columbia.
Thomas Martin Franck, international law scholar and NYU law professor emeritus, former editor-In-chief of the American Journal of International Law.
Frank Iacobucci , former Supreme Court of Canada justice and former dean of the University of Toronto Faculty of Law.
Ted Lee, former diplomat and historian, former governor of Canada to the International Atomic Energy Agency.
 Mark Okerstrom, 2004 president/CEO of Expedia Group
Bud Smith , former attorney general of BC
 Ari Taub (born 1971), Olympic Greco-Roman wrestler
Jody Wilson-Raybould, former attorney general of Canada Minister of Justice, Member of Parliament for Vancouver Granville
Zoe Si, Pulitzer Prize-nominated cartoonist

References

External links
 Peter A. Allard School of Law
 History of legal education in British Columbia
 Allard School of Law and Business Society
 North American Consortium on Legal Education

Allard
Law schools in Canada
Peter A. Allard School of Law
Educational institutions established in 1945
1945 establishments in British Columbia